Les Morfalous (literally The Greedy-Guts, in French argot ; English title: The Vultures) is a 1984 French adventure film, starring Jean-Paul Belmondo and directed by Henri Verneuil, featuring the French Foreign Legion during the Second World War.

It is a remake of the 1970 American war film Kelly's Heroes.

Plot 
In French Tunisia, during the Second World War, a convoy of the French Foreign Legion is charged to recover gold bars of six billion francs from a bank in El Ksour in order to bring them into a safe place for the French government.

On 5 April 1943, a contingent of the Foreign Legion enters the seemingly abandoned and partially destroyed town of El Ksour. Unbeknownst to them, a German platoon holds the town and ambushes the FFL convoy - killing most of them. Only five legionnaires survive the attack and take refuge in a hotel in ruins.

At night, legionnaire Borzik heads out with Adjudant Mahuzard (Michel Constantin) to recover arms and ammunition. But Borzik is killed.

The remaining légionnaires include Sergent Augagneur(=to winner) (Jean-Paul Belmondo) and Boissier (Michel Creton). They find the corpulent and pusillanimous artilleryman Béral (Jacques Villeret) sitting in the toilets, suffering from dysentery.

Beral and Augagneur then sneak out and use a howitzer on the Germans, killing them all except Captain Karl Brenner.

The legionnaires enter the bank. Augagneur and Boissier want to steal the gold for themselves, but Mahuzard wishes to continue the original mission. A fight breaks out between Mahuzard and Augagneur. Augagneur wins and locks Mahuzard in a room, as the manager of the bank arrives, François de La Roche-Fréon.

Augagneur then tries to seduce Helene, Francois' wife. They are interrupted by the German lieutenant Karl, who arrives in a tank. Karl became friendly with Helen during the occupation. Helen helps Augagneur capture Karl and suggests they take the gold and sell it to an American launderer, Bob Turner, and split it three ways.

Meanwhile, in the bank, Mahuzard convinces Béral release him. He captures Augagneur and Karl upon their return and locks them in a vault with Bossier.

Mahuzard has dinner with the bank manager and his wife, who steals the key to the vault. Helen releases Augagneur, Boissier and Karl. They return with the tank surprise Mahuzard and Béral who have just completed the loading of gold in an armored car and preparing to leave. In the meantime, Francois has electrocuted himself to death by urinating on a live wire.

Augagneur sends Boissier seize the van. Mahuzard shoots Boissier dead. Karl fires the tank and completely destroys the van containing the gold, killing Mahuzard and Béral instantly.

Helene tries to get Augagneur to kill Karl, but he refuses, Karl also reveals Helene made the same offer to him against Augagneur. The two ex-soldiers then loaded the bulk of bullion on the truck, leaving only 300 kilos of gold to Helene while they take 10,000.

Augagneur and Karl head south in the tank to sell the gold, but have to stop at a German filling station to refuel. Karl persuades Augagneur to leave the tank so he will not be spotted. The German commander wants the tank. Augagneur escapes into the desert and has to give up the gold.

The film concludes with a quote from Blaise Cendrars: "I was the richest man in the world, gold has ruined me. "

Cast
 Jean-Paul Belmondo (Sergent Pierre Augagneur)
 Michel Constantin (Adjudant Edouard Mahuzard)
 Marie Laforêt (Hélène de La Roche-Fréon)
 Michel Creton (Légionnaire Boissier)
 Jacques Villeret (Brigadier Béral)
 François Perrot (François de La Roche-Fréon)
 Maurice Auzel (Légionnaire Borzik)
 Matthias Habich (Oberstleutnant Karl Brenner)
 Pierre Semmler (Hauptmann Ulrich Dieterle)

Production
Verneuil was developing the project for a number of years and was thinking of casting Victor Lanoux when Belmondo read the script and wanted to do it. Filming took place on location in Tunisia.

Reception
The film was the sixth most popular movie of 1984 in France. However its box office performance was considered a slight disappointment.

See also
French Foreign Legion in popular culture
French cinema

References

External links 

Le Morfalous at Le Film Guide

1984 films
1980s adventure comedy films
1980s war comedy films
French war comedy films
French adventure comedy films
French war adventure films
1980s French-language films
Films directed by Henri Verneuil
Films set in 1943
Films set in Tunisia
Films shot in Tunisia
Films with screenplays by Michel Audiard
French remakes of American films
Films about the French Foreign Legion
North African campaign films
Films scored by Georges Delerue
1984 comedy films
1980s French films